Crestview may refer to:

Places
Canada
Crestview, Ottawa, Ontario

United States
 Crestview, California, in Mono County
 Crestview, Los Angeles, California
 Crestview, Florida
 Crestview, Georgia
 Crestview, Hawaii
 Crestview, Kentucky
 Crestview, New Mexico
 Crestview, Austin, Texas, a neighborhood
 Crestview, Rock County, Wisconsin

Train stations
 Crestview station, a commuter rail station in Austin, Texas
 Crestview station (Florida), defunct

See also 
 Crestview High School (disambiguation)
 Crestview Local School District (disambiguation)